Reinhold F. Glei (born 11 June 1959 in Remscheid) is a German philologist and translator.

External links
 
 Eintrag in der Bochumer Hochschulbibliographie

People from Remscheid
University of Cologne alumni
German classical philologists
Academic staff of the University of Göttingen
Academic staff of Heinrich Heine University Düsseldorf
Academic staff of Ruhr University Bochum
Academic staff of Bielefeld University
German translators
Translators from Greek
Translators to German
1959 births
Living people
German male non-fiction writers